Pinchbeck United Football Club is a football club based in Pinchbeck, Lincolnshire, England.

History
The club joined the Premier Division of the Peterborough & District League in 1958. They were Premier Division champions in 1989–90, retaining the title the following season. In 2003–04 the club finished bottom of the Premier Division, but were not relegated to Division One. They were champions again in 2011–12, also winning the Peterborough Senior Cup. After finishing as runners-up in 2016–17, the club were promoted to Division One of the United Counties League. As a result of their promotion, the club moved first team matches to Spalding United's Sir Halley Stewart Field, with the reserves remaining at their Knight Street ground.

In 2017–18 Pinchbeck were Division One champions, earning promotion to the Premier Division.

Honours
United Counties League
Division One champions 2017–18
Peterborough & District League
Premier Division champions 1989–90, 1990–91, 2011–12
Presidents Premier Shield winners 2015–16, 2016–17
Peterborough Senior Cup
Winners 2011–12

References

External links
Official website
 

Football clubs in England
Football clubs in Lincolnshire
Peterborough and District Football League
United Counties League